Sweet Anita (born 28 July 1990) is an English Twitch streamer and YouTuber.

Early life
Anita was raised in East Anglia by a single mother before moving to South West England.

She was diagnosed with Tourette's syndrome, including the rare symptom of coprolalia, at the age of 27. She exhibited symptoms of the disorder throughout her teenage years and could only participate in formal education for a year because of her tics. Anita attempted to get a medical diagnosis when she was 13 but the doctor did not take her symptoms seriously and said she would grow out of it, while dismissing her as attention-seeking. A decade later, she again attempted to get a diagnosis, this time at a hospital. After a week of tests, she was diagnosed with Tourette's syndrome.

Career
Anita began streaming on Twitch in 2018. Her early streams consisted of gaming content, primarily Overwatch. She quickly gained popularity after clips of her profanity-laden outbursts, caused by her tics, went viral. Later that year, Variety named Anita among the most influential people in video games.

Anita was nominated in 2019 for her first major award at the 11th Shorty Awards for "Twitch Streamer of the Year".

In mid-2019, Anita reported that she was experiencing long-term harassment and abuse from an unidentified stalker. In a Twitter post, Anita criticised the police's handling of the situation, saying "If anything happens to me, I really hope that I'm the last canary in the coal mine. The law needs to change. No job should have such a high risk of rape, assault or death, especially not live streaming." In September 2020, Anita released a YouTube video detailing her ordeal along with the experience of several other online personalities in regards to stalking, in order to spread awareness on the matter.

Anita has worked with UK-based charity Tourettes Action, hosting fundraisers for the organisation on multiple occasions.

In December 2020, Anita hosted VY Esports' online gaming festival LuudoFest!

Personal life
Outside of streaming, Anita is an animal rehabilitator and has cared for several animals including rabbits, rats, and chinchillas. She also ran her own business selling sea glass she collected from the seashore. Anita has done several interviews regarding her condition in an effort to raise awareness and promote education on the effects of Tourette's syndrome, by citing examples such as its impact on daily social interactions.

Awards and nominations

References

Living people
Twitch (service) streamers
English YouTubers
People with Tourette syndrome
Golden Joystick Award winners
Gaming YouTubers
1990 births